Charles Ralph Campbell (14 December 1881 – 19 April 1948) was a British sailor who competed in the 1908 Summer Olympics. He was a crew member of the British boat Cobweb, which won the gold medal in the 8 metre class.

References

External links
profile

1881 births
1948 deaths
British male sailors (sport)
Sailors at the 1908 Summer Olympics – 8 Metre
Olympic sailors of Great Britain
Olympic gold medallists for Great Britain
Olympic medalists in sailing
Medalists at the 1908 Summer Olympics